Tracy Telligman (most often billed as "Tra" Telligman ; born February 7, 1965) is a retired American mixed martial artist and boxer who has fought in the UFC, PRIDE, and Pancrase. He is also known for fighting despite having only one pectoralis major muscle.

Background
Telligman was born in Dallas, Texas. He was in a car accident when he was only one and a half years old, and as a result, he is missing his right pectoral and also his right lung, leaving a deep recess in his chest. The accident also crushed his ribs and he has lived with the deformity ever since. Telligman began training in Karate when he was 8 years old, continuing until he was 13 years old, and then began Boxing until he was 15. He then began training in Jiu-Jitsu and participated in a full-contact Karate contest when he was in high school. Telligman also trained in Taekwondo, Kung Fu, Judo, and Wrestling.

Mixed martial arts career

Early career
Telligman began training with the famed Lion's Den gym after meeting Ken Shamrock and fellow-Texas native and karate practitioner, Guy Mezger. Telligman's first professional fight was in 1995, and he won his first three fights, all by strikes in the first round before being invited to compete in the UFC.

UFC
Telligman made his UFC debut at UFC 12 in the UFC 12 Heavyweight Tournament against future UFC Light Heavyweight Champion, Vitor Belfort. Telligman was handed his first professional loss only one minute into the fight and Belfort would go on to win the tournament.

Two fights later, he faced Keiichiro Yamamiya in Pancrase and the fight ended in a draw. Telligman then returned to the UFC at UFC Japan against Brad Kohler and won via armbar submission in the first round. Two fights later, he returned again at UFC 20 to face Pedro Rizzo and was knocked out from punches 4:30 into the fight.

PRIDE
A year later, Telligman made his PRIDE debut at Pride 9 against Carlos Barreto and lost via unanimous decision.

In his next bout for the promotion, Telligman faced legendary Ukrainian kickboxer, Igor Vovchanchyn at Pride 13, and took the fight on two-weeks notice after teammate, Ken Shamrock, who was originally supposed to fight Vovchanchyn, hurt his neck in training. Despite being a heavy underdog, Telligman won via unanimous decision, as his boxing technique and footwork made the fight difficult for Vovchanchyn. This win was one of the biggest upsets in the sport's history at the time and after the win, Telligman became the #10 ranked Heavyweight in the world.

Return to the UFC
Two years later, Telligman made his return to the UFC in a rematch with Pedro Rizzo at UFC 43 and lost again via TKO due to a doctor stoppage 4:24 into the second round. Telligman then faced former UFC Heavyweight Champion Tim Sylvia and lost via head kick knockout at just under five minutes into the fight. Sylvia would go on to become UFC Heavyweight Champion a second time two fights after his win over Telligman.

Telligman became semi-retired from the sport after his loss to Sylvia, but has since retired from the sport altogether.

Tra was last seen coaching in the World Combat League.

Personal life
Telligman is married.

Championships and Accomplishments
Icon Sport
SuperBrawl 1 Heavyweight Tournament Winner

Mixed martial arts record

|-
| Loss
| align=center| 7–5–1
| Tim Sylvia
| KO (head kick)
| UFC 54
| 
| align=center| 1
| align=center| 4:59
| Las Vegas, Nevada, United States
| 
|-
| Loss
| align=center| 7–4–1
| Pedro Rizzo
| TKO (doctor stoppage)
| UFC 43
| 
| align=center| 2
| align=center| 4:24
| Las Vegas, Nevada, United States
| 
|-
| Win
| align=center| 7–3–1
| Igor Vovchanchyn
| Decision (unanimous)
| Pride 13 - Collision Course
| 
| align=center| 3
| align=center| 5:00
| Saitama, Japan
| 
|-
| Loss
| align=center| 6–3–1
| Carlos Barreto
| Decision (unanimous)
| Pride 9
| 
| align=center| 2
| align=center| 10:00
| Nagoya, Japan
| 
|-
| Loss
| align=center| 6–2–1
| Pedro Rizzo
| KO (punches)
| UFC 20
| 
| align=center| 1
| align=center| 4:30
| Birmingham, Alabama, United States
| 
|-
| Win
| align=center| 6–1–1
| David Rivera
| TKO (punches)
| World Pancration Championships 2
| 
| align=center| 1
| align=center| N/A
| Dallas, Texas, United States
| 
|-
| Win
| align=center| 5–1–1
| Brad Kohler
| Submission (armbar)
| UFC Japan
| 
| align=center| 1
| align=center| 10:05
| Yokohama, Japan
| 
|-
|  Draw
| align=center| 4–1–1
| Keiichiro Yamamiya
| Draw (majority)
| Pancrase: Alive 9
| 
| align=center| 2
| align=center| 3:00
| Tokyo, Japan
| 
|-
| Win
| align=center| 4–1
| Rick Mathis
| Submission (heel hook)
| World Pankration Championships 1
| 
| align=center| 1
| align=center| 0:58
| Texas, United States
| 
|-
| Loss
| align=center| 3–1
| Vitor Belfort
| TKO (cut)
| UFC 12
| 
| align=center| 1
| align=center| 1:17
| Dothan, Alabama, United States
| 
|-
| Win
| align=center| 3–0
| Walt Darby
| Submission (punches)
| SuperBrawl 1
| 
| align=center| 1
| align=center| 2:09
| Honolulu, Hawaii, United States
| 
|-
| Win
| align=center| 2–0
| Brian Matapua
| Submission (punches)
| SuperBrawl 1
| 
| align=center| 1
| align=center| 2:04
| Honolulu, Hawaii, United States
| 
|-
| Win
| align=center| 1–0
| Vladimir Hoodenkih
| KO (punches)
| Absolute Fighting Championship 1
| 
| align=center| 1
| align=center| 1:40
| Moscow, Russia
| 
|-
|}

Professional boxing record

References

External links

1965 births
Living people
American male mixed martial artists
Mixed martial artists utilizing karate
Mixed martial artists utilizing boxing
Mixed martial artists utilizing jujutsu
Ultimate Fighting Championship male fighters
American jujutsuka
American male karateka
American male boxers